The Muzha Refuse Incineration Plant is an incinerator in Muzha, Wenshan District, Taipei, Taiwan.

History
The construction of the plant started on 1 July 1989 and completed in January 1994. It began its commercial operation on 28 March 1995. On 13 June 2018, Taipei Mayor Ko Wen-je announced that the plant will undergo refurbishment works, such as the upgrading of its gas treatment and electrical system, repainting of the stack with images of blue magpies, rhododendrons and banyan trees.

Architecture
The plant consists of one stack with a height of 150 meters. It is decorated with images of giraffes.

Technical details
The plant has a capacity of treating 1,200 tons of garbage per day from its four boilers. As of 2020, it received a total of 26,073 tons of garbage annually and incinerated 25,682 tons of them.

Transportation
The plant is accessible within walking distance north east of Taipei Zoo Station of Taipei Metro.

See also
 Air pollution in Taiwan

References

External links

  

1995 establishments in Taiwan
Giraffes in art
Incinerators in Taipei
Infrastructure completed in 1994